The Villa de Madrid Trophy was an annual pre-season football tournament hosted by Atlético Madrid at the Vicente Calderón Stadium played since 1973, with the exception of 1999 and 2001. In 2004 the tournament changed its name to "Trophy Hellboy", but was discontinued in the subsequent seasons.

The hosts, Atlético Madrid, are the top winners with 18 victories. Immediately behind them is A.C. Milan with three.  They are followed by a group of teams with a win in the competition such as Liverpool, PSV Eindhoven, Werder Bremen, Independiente and River Plate. Initially, the competition was a four-team tournament and included two semi-finals, a third place play-off, and a final, but from 1994 to 2003 the tournament was played in a single match format.

List of winners 

Notes

Titles by club

Titles by country

References

Atlético Madrid
Spanish football friendly trophies
1973 establishments in Spain
Recurring sporting events established in 1973
2003 disestablishments in Spain
Recurring sporting events disestablished in 2003